Me & Paul is the 32nd studio album by country singer Willie Nelson. The titular Paul, refers to his long-term drummer, Paul English.

Track listing
All songs written by Willie Nelson except where noted.
"I Been to Georgia on a Fast Train" (Billy Joe Shaver) - 3:12
"Forgiving You Was Easy" - 2:51
"I Let My Mind Wander" - 4:02
"I'm a Memory" - 2:12
"She's Gone" - 3:09
"Old Five & Dimers Like Me" (Shaver) - 3:08
"I Never Cared For You" - 2:06
"You Wouldn't Cross the Street (To Say Goodbye)" - 3:01
"Me and Paul" - 2:54
"One Day at a Time" - 2:11 
"Pretend I Never Happened" - 3:37
"Black Rose" (Shaver) - 2:36

Personnel
Willie Nelson - Guitar, vocals
Billy Gene English - Drums
Paul English - Percussion, drums
Grady Martin - Guitar
Bobbie Nelson - Piano
Jody Payne - Guitar
Mickey Raphael - Harmonica
Bee Spears - Bass

Charts

Weekly charts

Year-end charts

References

1985 albums
Willie Nelson albums